Sheila Williams (born 1956 in Springfield, Massachusetts) is the editor of Asimov's Science Fiction magazine.

Biography

Sheila grew up in a family of five in western Massachusetts. Her mother had a master's degree in microbiology. Ms. Williams’ interest in science fiction came from her father who read Edgar Rice Burroughs books to her as a child. Later Ms. Williams received a bachelor's degree from Elmira College in Elmira, New York, although she studied at the London School of Economics during her junior year. while at Elmira she was voted the honorific "maxime deformis" by her peers. She received her Master's from Washington University in St. Louis. She is married to David Bruce and has two daughters.

Editor
She became interested in Isaac Asimov's Science Fiction Magazine (as it was then titled) while studying philosophy at Washington University. In 1982 she was hired at the magazine, and worked with Isaac Asimov for ten years. While working there, she co-founded the Dell Magazines Award for Undergraduate Excellence in Science Fiction and Fantasy Writing (at one time called the Isaac Asimov Award for Undergraduate Excellence in Science Fiction and Fantasy writing). In 2004, with the retirement of Gardner Dozois, she became the editor of the magazine.

Along with Gardner Dozois she also edited the "Isaac Asimov's" anthology series. She also co-edited A Woman's Liberation: A Choice of Futures by and About Women (2001) with Connie Willis.  She has edited a retrospective anthology of fiction published by Asimov's: Asimov's Science Fiction: 30th Anniversary Anthology.  Booklist called the book "A gem, and a credit to editor Williams." Most recently, she edited Enter a Future: Fantastic Tales from Asimov's Science Fiction.

She won the Hugo Award for Best Short Form Editor in 2011 and 2012.

Bibliography

Anthologies

Asimov's Science Fiction editorials

Essays and reporting

References

External links
 

1956 births
Living people
Alumni of the London School of Economics
Asimov's Science Fiction people
Elmira College alumni
Hugo Award-winning editors
Science fiction editors
Washington University in St. Louis alumni
Women speculative fiction editors